Valerio Foglio (born 9 February 1985) is an Italian football defender currently playing for Legnano.

Career

Atalanta

Vicenza
Foglio was signed by Serie B club Vicenza in a co-ownership deal for €500,000 in June 2004, as part of Claudio Rivalta's deal for €1.7 million. In June 2006 Vicenza acquired Foglio outright for free.

AlbinoLeffe
In July 2009, he left for AlbinoLeffe in co-ownership deal for €190,000 in a 4-year contract. In June 2010 AlbinoLeffe signed Foglio outright for another €160,000.

In 2010–11 season he changed his shirt number to no.11, and gave the no.5 to Dario Passoni.

Grosseto
In 2012, he was signed by Grosseto.

Reggina
On 3 September 2013 he was sold to Serie B club Reggina.

Monza
On 18 June 2014 he was signed by Monza.

Novara
On 13 January 2015, he was signed by Novara Calcio.

Montova
On 31 August 2015 Foglio was signed by Mantova in a 3-year deal.

References

External links

1985 births
Living people
People from Legnano
Italian footballers
Association football defenders
Footballers from Lombardy
Atalanta B.C. players
L.R. Vicenza players
Pisa S.C. players
F.C. Pavia players
A.C. Legnano players
U.C. AlbinoLeffe players
F.C. Grosseto S.S.D. players
Reggina 1914 players
A.C. Monza players
Novara F.C. players
Mantova 1911 players
Carrarese Calcio players
Serie B players
Serie C players
A.S. Giana Erminio players
Sportspeople from the Metropolitan City of Milan